St. Stephen's College, Uzhavoor, is a general degree college located in Uzhavoor, Kottayam district, Kerala. It was established in the year 1964. The college is affiliated with Mahatma Gandhi University. This college offers different courses in arts, commerce and science.

Departments

Science

Physics
Chemistry
Mathematics
Life Sciences
Computer Science

Arts and Commerce

Malayalam
English
History
Political Science
Economics
Physical Education
Commerce

Accreditation
The college is  recognized by the University Grants Commission (UGC).

References

External links
http://www.ststephens.net.in
https://youtube.com/channel/UCwEQNLVkm-trVi1RmPqXOXw

Universities and colleges in Kottayam district
Educational institutions established in 1964
1964 establishments in Kerala
Arts and Science colleges in Kerala
Colleges affiliated to Mahatma Gandhi University, Kerala